

Competitors

Medalists

| style="text-align:left; vertical-align:top;"|

|  style="text-align:left; vertical-align:top;"|

|

Archery

Compound

Recurve

Athletics

Men

Track

Field

Women

Field

Badminton

Singles
Men

Women

Doubles

Judo

Men

Women

Swimming

Men

Shooting 

Men

Powerlifting

Table tennis

Men

Women

Wheelchair fencing

Men

References

External links
 Official website of Paralympic Committee of India

Nations at the 2014 Asian Para Games
India at the Asian Para Games
2014 in Indian sport